Hoodies All Summer is the sixth studio album by British rapper Kano. The album was released on 30 August 2019 by Parlophone Records and Bigger Picture Music. It follows the album Made in the Manor, released in 2016. It includes guest appearances from Ghetts, D Double E, Popcaan, Kojo Funds and Lil Silva, with production handled by Blue May and Jodi Milliner.

Promotion
The album was announced on 19 July 2019, alongside its cover art and track listing. Two singles were released on the same day: "Trouble" and "Class of Deja" featuring D Double E and Ghetts.

Critical reception 

Hoodies All Summer was met with critical acclaim upon its release. At Metacritic, which assigns a normalized rating out of 100 to reviews from music critics, the album has received an average score of 79, indicating "generally well received", based on 13 reviews.

Kitty Empire of The Observer stressed the album's "clarion-clear narratives about knife crime and the importance of good times", adding that these topics are "delivered not just with anger and pathos, but humour." William Rosebury of The Line of Best Fit concluded that Hoodies All Summer is "an exceptional achievement, proving once again that Kano is one of the UK’s most versatile, thoughtful and talented voices", while complimenting the stripped-back production that "consistently ensures that Kano’s voice is always front and centre."

Hoodies all Summer was also nominated for the 2020 Mercury Music Prize.

Track listing

Personnel
Credits adapted from Tidal.

Musicians
 Kano – main artist, claps 
 Blue May – production , synthesiser , claps , tambourine , piano 
 Jodi Milliner – production , piano , bass , synthesiser , claps 
 Hal Ritson – production, violin 
 Louise Clare Marshall – vocals 
 Nerys Richards – cello 
 Sam Beste – piano 
 Marianne Haynes – violin 
 Amy Stanford – viola 
 Gita Langley – violin 
 Kotono Sato – violin 
 Beverly Tawiah – choir vocals 
 Emily Holligan – choir vocals 
 Olivia Williams – choir vocals 
 Vula Malinga – choir vocals 
 Wilson Atie – choir vocals 
 Valentina Pappalardo – backing vocals 

Technical
 Blue May – mixing , programming , synthesiser programming 
 Jodi Milliner – programming , drum programming , synthesiser programming 
 Amy Langley – arranging, cello 
 Hal Ritson – programming 
 Matt Colton – mastering 
 Quays – drum programming 
 Richard Adlam – programming 
 Scott Knapper – engineer

Charts

References 

2019 albums
Kano (rapper) albums